The 1987 NCAA Division I softball tournament was held in May as the conclusion of the 1987 NCAA Division I softball season. Sixteen Division I college softball teams competed in the NCAA tournament's first round, which consisted of eight regionals with two teams each. The winner of each region, a total of eight teams, advanced to the 1987 Women's College World Series in Omaha, Nebraska. The event, held from May 20 to 24, was the sixth NCAA-sponsored championship in the sport of college softball at the Division I level. Texas A&M won the championship by defeating UCLA 4–1 in the final game.

Regionals

Arizona State qualifies for WCWS, 2–0

UCLA qualifies for WCWS, 2–0

Fresno State qualifies for WCWS, 2–0

Nebraska qualifies for WCWS, 2–0

Cal State Fullerton qualifies for WCWS, 2–0

Florida State qualifies for WCWS, 2–0

Texas A&M qualifies for WCWS, 2–0

Central Michigan qualifies for WCWS, 2–1

Women's College World Series

Participants

Texas A&M
UCLA

Game results

Bracket

Game log

Championship Game

All-Tournament Team
The following players were named to the All-Tournament Team

See also
NCAA Division I Softball Championship
Women's College World Series
NCAA Division II Softball Championship
NCAA Division III Softball Championship
College World Series

References

1987 NCAA Division I softball season
NCAA Division I softball tournament